The Harbison College President's Home near Abbeville, South Carolina was built in 1906. It was listed on the National Register of Historic Places in 1983.

References

Houses on the National Register of Historic Places in South Carolina
Houses completed in 1906
Houses in Abbeville County, South Carolina
National Register of Historic Places in Abbeville County, South Carolina
1906 establishments in South Carolina